This is a list of the voivodeships of Poland by Human Development Index as of 2021.

Development 1995–2019
Source

See also
List of countries by Human Development Index

References 

Poland
Poland
Human Development Index